van Bekkum is a surname. Notable people with the surname include:

Dick van Bekkum (1925–2015), Dutch medical-radiobiologist
Herman van Bekkum (born 1932), Dutch chemist
Willem van Bekkum (1910–1998), Dutch bishop of the Roman Catholic Diocese of Ruteng
Wout van Bekkum (born 1954), Dutch Middle East studies scholar

Dutch-language surnames
Surnames of Dutch origin